A number of steamships have carried the name Elbe, including:

 , a Norddeutscher Lloyd ship sunk in 1895
 , a Bugsier Reederei & Bergungs ship in service 1921–1945

Ship names